Volodymyr Pavlovych Kulayev (born 26 February 1958 in Kharkiv, Ukrainian SSR) is a professional Ukrainian football coach. 

In 2004-2006 he served as a head coach of the Ukraine women's national football team.

References

External links

 Andriy Varakin. Volodymyr Kulayev: In the new season the FC Kharkiv game play will change (Владимир Кулаев: "В новом сезоне игровой стиль "Харькова" изменится"). UA-Football. 13 July 2006

1958 births
Living people
Footballers from Kharkiv
Ukrainian footballers
FC Olympik Kharkiv players
FC Alga Bishkek players
Ukrainian football managers
Ukrainian expatriate football managers
Expatriate football managers in Morocco
Expatriate football managers in Russia
FC Nyva Bershad managers
FC Kharkiv managers
Ukrainian Premier League managers
WFC Donchanka Donetsk managers
Wydad AC managers
WFC Zhytlobud-1 Kharkiv managers
Ukraine women's national football team managers
Association footballers not categorized by position